Reginald Birch (7 June 1914 – 2 June 1994) was a British communist and trade unionist, aligning with Maoism later in his career.

Early political activism 
Born in Kilburn, London, Birch became a toolmaker and joined the Amalgamated Engineering Union (AEU). He became active in the union and also in supporting the Republican government of Spain against the fascist invasion and coup (see Spanish Civil War). He joined the Communist Party of Great Britain (CPGB) in 1939.

In 1941, Birch worked with Wal Hannington to organise a strike at Swift Scales, an engineering firm in Park Royal. This action was illegal under wartime regulations, but the two were merely bound over to keep the peace.  Soon after, Hitler invaded the Soviet Union, and the CPGB opposed wartime strike action. Throughout the war, Birch continued to organise his workmates in a succession of factories.

In 1956, Birch was elected to the executive committee of the CPGB. Journalist Peter Paterson observed: "When I asked him how he could possibly have sided with the 'tankies', so called because of the use of Russian tanks to quell the revolt, he said 'they wanted a trade unionist who could stomach Hungary, and I fitted the bill'."

In 1960, he was elected as a full-time AEU official. The union was soon renamed the Amalgamated Union of Engineering Workers, and in 1966, Birch was elected to its executive. Birch challenged William Carron for the leadership on two occasions. On the second, the CPGB supported Hugh Scanlon's candidature over that of Birch.

Communist Party of Britain (Marxist–Leninist) 
At odds with those perceived as revisionists within the CPGB, Birch left the party soon afterwards. With comrades from the AEU and others, he formed the Communist Party of Britain (Marxist–Leninist) (CPB (M-L)) in 1968. Birch continued to help to organise various strikes, including the 1971 Ford strike. He met Mao Zedong, Zhou Enlai and Enver Hoxha on visits to China and Albania. In 1975, he was elected to the general council of the Trades Union Congress. In 1977, he became a member of the Energy Commission. He retired in 1979, but remained chairman of the CPB (M-L) until 1985.

References

Further reading 
 
 "Reg Birch" at Oxford Dictionary of National Biography.
 Podmore, Will (2004). Reg Birch: Engineer, Trade Unionist, Communist. .

1914 births
1994 deaths
Anti-revisionists
British communists
British political party founders
Communist Party of Britain (Marxist–Leninist) members
Communist Party of Great Britain members
Hoxhaists
Members of the General Council of the Trades Union Congress
People from Kilburn, London